Lumpzig is a village and a former municipality in the district Altenburger Land, in Thuringia, Germany. Since 1 January 2019, it is part of the town Schmölln.

References

Altenburger Land
Duchy of Saxe-Altenburg
Former municipalities in Thuringia